Llanion Halt railway station served the suburb of Llanion, Pembrokeshire, Wales, from 1905 to 1908 on the Pembroke and Tenby Railway.

History 
The station was opened on 1 May 1905 by the Great Western Railway. It was a short-lived station, only being open for three years before closing on 1 October 1908.

References 

Disused railway stations in Pembrokeshire
Former Great Western Railway stations
Railway stations in Great Britain opened in 1905
Railway stations in Great Britain closed in 1908
1905 establishments in Wales